West Virginia held elections on November 6, 2018. Elections for the United States House and Senate were held as well as two high-profile ballot measures. These elections were held concurrently with other elections nationwide. Primary elections were held on May 8, 2018.

Federal offices

House of Representatives 

In District 1, Republican incumbent David McKinley won reelection with 64.6% of the vote, defeating Democratic challenger Kendra Fershee, a West Virginia University law professor.

In District 2, Republican incumbent Alex Mooney won reelection with 53.9% of the vote, defeating Talley Sergent, a former U.S. State Department official.

In District 3, Republican incumbent Evan Jenkins resigned in September 2018. Democratic state Senator Richard Ojeda challenged Republican Majority Whip of the West Virginia House of Delegates Carol Miller. Miller won with 56.4% of the vote.

Senate 

Incumbent Democrat Joe Manchin was ranked by many outlets to be one of the most vulnerable incumbents up for election. His challenger was Attorney General of West Virginia Patrick Morrisey who  won a contentious Republican primary. Manchin won the election with 49.6% of the vote against Morrisey's 46.3% vote share. This was much lower than Manchin's previous performance of a vote share 60.6% in 2012.

State Legislature

State Senate 

17 of the 34 State Senate seats were up for election in 2018. Democrats won a net gain of 2 seats, but Republicans maintained their majority with 20 seats to Democrat's 14. A total of 5 Republican incumbents lost their election, 3 in their primaries and 2 in the general election.

House of Delegates 
All 100 seats in the West Virginia House of Delegates were up for election. The Republican majority sustained a net loss of 4 seats, decreasing the majority from 63 to 59. A total of 5 Democrats, 7 Republicans, and 1 Independent incumbents lost reelection in either their primaries or in the general election.

Ballot Measures

Amendment 1 
"No Constitutional right to abortion Amendment"

To amend the West Virginia Constitution to clarify that nothing in the Constitution of West Virginia secures or protects a right to abortion or requires the funding of abortion.

Amendment 2 
Amended the state constitution to authorize the legislature to reduce the budget of the state judiciary by up to 15 percent, among other things relating to the judiciary.

Supreme Court of Appeals 
Two special elections were held after the resignation of Justices Menis Ketchum and Robin Davis in July and August respectively. The resignations came after revelations and legislative investigations into a misuse of state funds and corruption of the state judiciary. Tim Armstead was appointed to Ketchum's seat and Evan Jenkins was appointed to Davis's seat by Governor Jim Justice.

Division 1

Candidates 

 Tim Armstead, incumbent justice of the West Virginia Supreme Court of Appeals, Speaker of the West Virginia House of Delegates from 2015 to 2018.
 Joanna I. Tabit, judge on the Thirteenth Circuit Court in West Virginia.
 Chris Wilkes.
 Mark Hunt, member of the West Virginia House of Delegates from District 36.
 Ronald Hatfield Jr.

Division 2

Candidates 

 Evan Jenkins, incumbent justice of the West Virginia Supreme Court of Appeals, U.S. Representative from WV from 2015 to 2018.
 Dennise Renee Smith, assistant attorney general of West Virginia.
 Jeffrey Kessler, former West Virginia State Senate President.
 Jim Douglas, Judge on the West Virginia Family Court Circuit 11, Division 5.
 Robert Frank.

References 

 
West Virginia judicial elections